The super heavyweight competition at the 2015 AIBA World Boxing Championships was held from 7–15 October 2015. This is a qualifying tournament for the 2016 Summer Olympics. Tony Yoka of France defeated Ivan Dychko of Kazakhstan to win the world title.

Medalists

Seeds

  Ivan Dychko
  Filip Hrgović (quarterfinals)
  Joseph Joyce (semifinals)
  Lenier Pero(round of 16)

Draw

Finals

Section 1

Section 2

Results

Ranking

References

External links
Draw Sheet

2015 AIBA World Boxing Championships